Woolsbarrow Hillfort is a hillfort on Bloxworth Heath in the district of Purbeck in the county of Dorset, England. It dates to the period from the Late Bronze Age to the Early Iron Age (8th–5th centuries BC) and is classed as an ancient monument. Despite the hillfort only being at an altitude of  it is said to "dominate the surrounding heathland."

Location 
Woolsbarrow Hillfort is located in a clearing in the forests of Bloxworth Heath. The heath is a popular walking area and the site can be reached by public footpath.

Description 
Woolsbarrow is a slight univallate hillfort on a flat-topped knoll on the plateau of Bloxworth Heath, which separates the rivers Sherford to the east and Piddle to the west. The eastern part of the hillfort has been damaged by sand and gravel extraction, but much of it survives well and has the potential for further archaeological evidence to be uncovered.

It is one of only about 150 slight univallate hillforts nationally and is of national importance.

References

External links 

Hill forts in Dorset